André Lee Roberson (born December 4, 1991) is an American professional basketball player for the Oklahoma City Blue of the NBA G League. He played college basketball for the Colorado Buffaloes. As a junior in 2013, Roberson earned first-team all-conference honors in the Pac-12 for the second time, and was also named the Pac-12 Defensive Player of the Year. He was selected in the first round of the 2013 NBA draft with the 26th overall pick. He was acquired by the Oklahoma City Thunder in a draft night trade. He was named to the NBA All-Defensive Second Team in 2017.

High school career
Roberson attended Karen Wagner High School on the outskirts of San Antonio. During his senior year, he averaged 15 points, 12 rebounds and 1.7 blocked shots per game. Considered a three-star recruit by ESPN.com, Roberson was listed as the No. 62 power forward in the nation in 2010.

College career
Roberson played for the Colorado Buffaloes under coach Tad Boyle. In his three seasons at CU, Roberson was one of the country's top rebounders, finishing third in the country in 2011–12 and second in 2012–13. He led the Buffaloes to the NCAA Tournament both years. As a junior in 2012–13, Roberson averaged 10.9 points and 11.2 rebounds per game. He was named first-team All-Pac-12 and the conference Defensive Player of the Year. At the end of his junior season, Roberson declared his eligibility for the 2013 NBA draft.

Professional career

Oklahoma City Thunder (2013–2020)
Roberson was selected with the 26th overall pick in the 2013 NBA draft by the Minnesota Timberwolves, but was later acquired by the Oklahoma City Thunder on draft night. On July 12, he signed with the Thunder after an impressive Summer League performance. During his rookie season, he had multiple assignments with the Tulsa 66ers of the NBA Development League.

In July 2014, Roberson re-joined the Thunder for the 2014 NBA Summer League. On October 22, 2014, the Thunder exercised their third-year team option on Roberson's rookie scale contract, extending the contract through the 2015–16 season. Earning the Thunder's starting shooting guard spot for the 2014–15 season, Roberson recorded his first career double-double (10 points, 12 rebounds) on December 18 against the Golden State Warriors, and scored a then career-high 12 points on February 9 against the Denver Nuggets.

On October 23, 2015, the Thunder exercised their fourth-year team option on Roberson's rookie scale contract, extending the contract through the 2016–17 season. He retained the starting shooting guard spot in 2015–16, and on December 23, he scored a then career-high 15 points in a 120–85 win over the Los Angeles Lakers. On January 25, 2016, he was ruled out for three weeks with a right knee sprain. He returned to action on February 24 after missing 10 games. In Game 4 of the Western Conference Finals, Roberson scored a career-high 17 points and grabbed 12 rebounds, as the Thunder defeated the Golden State Warriors 118–94 to take a 3–1 lead in the series. The Thunder went on to lose the series in seven games.

Roberson was moved to the starting small forward spot for the 2016–17 season due to the loss of Kevin Durant and the acquisition of Victor Oladipo. On February 24, 2017, he set a new career high with 19 points in a 110–93 win over the Los Angeles Lakers. At the season's end, Roberson was named to the NBA All-Defensive Second Team.

On July 14, 2017, Roberson re-signed with the Thunder to a three-year, $30 million contract. After missing eight games in January 2018 with left patellar tendinitis, Roberson ruptured his left patellar tendon on January 27 against the Detroit Pistons. He underwent surgery the following day and was subsequently ruled out for the rest of the season.

On October 4, 2018, Roberson was ruled out for an additional two months after undergoing a procedure following a setback during his rehab from left knee surgery. In late November, Roberson experienced discomfort after landing from a jump, and an MRI revealed that he had suffered a small avulsion fracture in his knee. He was subsequently ruled out for at least another six weeks.

On August 1, 2020, Roberson played his first NBA game in more than two years, logging five minutes in a 110–94 win over the Utah Jazz.

Brooklyn Nets (2021)
On February 16, 2021, Roberson signed with the Brooklyn Nets. He played two games for the Nets before being waived on February 23. On February 26, Roberson signed a 10-day contract with the Nets.

Oklahoma City Blue (2023–present) 
On February 1, 2023, Roberson signed with the Oklahoma City Blue, the Thunder's G League affiliate.

Career statistics

NBA

Regular season

|-
| style="text-align:left;"|
| style="text-align:left;"|Oklahoma City
| 40 || 16 || 10.0 || .485 || .154 || .700 || 2.4 || .4 || .5 || .3 || 1.9
|-
| style="text-align:left;"|
| style="text-align:left;"|Oklahoma City
| 67 || 65 || 19.2 || .458 || .247 || .479 || 3.8 || 1.0 || .8 || .4 || 3.4
|-
| style="text-align:left;"|
| style="text-align:left;"|Oklahoma City
| 70 || 70 || 22.2 || .496 || .311 || .611 || 3.6 || .7 || .8 || .6 || 4.8
|-
| style="text-align:left;"|
| style="text-align:left;"|Oklahoma City
| 79 || 79 || 30.1 || .465 || .246 || .423 || 5.1 || 1.0 || 1.2 || 1.0 || 6.6
|-
| style="text-align:left;"|
| style="text-align:left;"|Oklahoma City
| 39 || 39 || 26.6 || .537 || .222 || .316 || 4.7 || 1.2 || 1.2 || .9 || 5.0
|-
| style="text-align:left;"|
| style="text-align:left;"|Oklahoma City
| 7 || 0 || 12.4 || .276 || .214 || .500 || 3.9 || .6 || .1 || .4 || 2.9
|-
| style="text-align:left;"|
| style="text-align:left;"|Brooklyn
| 5 || 0 || 12.6 || .143 || .125 || .500 || 3.0 || .8 || .6 || .2 || 1.2
|- class="sortbottom"
| style="text-align:center;" colspan="2"|Career
| 307 || 269 || 22.2 || .473 || .253 || .468 || 4.0 || .9 || .9 || .6 || 4.5

Playoffs

|-
| style="text-align:left;"|2014
| style="text-align:left;"|Oklahoma City
| 2 || 0 || 4.5 || .000 ||  ||  || 1.0 || .0 || .0 || .0 || .0
|-
| style="text-align:left;"|2016
| style="text-align:left;"|Oklahoma City
| 18 || 18 || 26.2 || .465 || .324 || .400 || 5.6 || .8 || 1.3 || 1.1 || 5.6
|-
| style="text-align:left;"|2017
| style="text-align:left;"|Oklahoma City
| 5 || 5 || 37.0 || .522 || .412 || .143 || 6.2 || 1.8 || style="background:#cfecec;"|2.4*  || style="background:#cfecec;"|3.4* || 11.6
|-
| style="text-align:left;"|2020
| style="text-align:left;"|Oklahoma City
| 1 || 0 || 3.0 || .000 || .000 ||  || .0 || .0 || .0 || .0 || .0
|- class="sortbottom"
| style="text-align:center;" colspan="2"|Career
| 26 || 23 || 25.7 || .471 || .345 || .268 || 5.2 || .9 || 1.3 || 1.4 || 6.1

College

|-
| style="text-align:left;"|2010–11
| style="text-align:left;"|Colorado
| 38 || 0 || 22.3 || .580 || .343 || .553 || 7.8 || .9 || 1.3 || 1.1 || 6.7
|-
| style="text-align:left;"|2011–12
| style="text-align:left;"|Colorado 
| 36 || 35 || 30.2 || .510 || .380 || .614 || 11.1 || 1.2 || 1.3 || 1.9 || 11.6
|-
| style="text-align:left;"|2012–13
| style="text-align:left;"|Colorado
| 31 || 30 || 33.4 || .480 || .328 || .551 || 11.2 || 1.4 || 2.2 || 1.3 || 10.9
|- class="sortbottom"
| style="text-align:center;" colspan="2"|Career
| 105 || 65 || 28.3 || .516 || .350 || .582 || 10.0 || 1.1 || 1.6 || 1.4 || 9.6

Personal life
Roberson comes from a family of athletes. Both of his parents were All-Americans in their respective sports during college at New Mexico State. He has six siblings. Other than the two youngest siblings who have not yet reached college age, all the Roberson children are current or former NCAA Division I athletes.

References

External links

 Colorado Buffaloes bio

1991 births
Living people
American men's basketball players
Basketball players from New Mexico
Basketball players from San Antonio
Brooklyn Nets players
Colorado Buffaloes men's basketball players
Minnesota Timberwolves draft picks
Oklahoma City Thunder players
Shooting guards
Small forwards
Sportspeople from Las Cruces, New Mexico
Tulsa 66ers players